Platypodiella is a genus of crabs in the family Xanthidae, containing the following species:

 Platypodiella gemmata (Rathbun, 1902)
 Platypodiella georgei den Hartog & Turkay, 1991
 Platypodiella picta (A. Milne Edwards, 1869)
 Platypodiella rotundata (Stimpson, 1860)
 Platypodiella spectabilis (Herbst, 1794)

References

Xanthoidea